The Daley family is an American political family from Chicago that is deeply entrenched in the vast political machine system of Illinois. Two family members have held the office of the Mayor of Chicago for a combined 43 years.
Some members of the Daley family currently reside in Buffalo, New York.

Notable members
Richard J. Daley (1902–1976)
Mayor of Chicago, 1955–1976
Eleanor "Sis" Daley (1907–2003)
Wife of Richard J. Daley
Richard M. Daley (born 1942)
Cook County State's Attorney, 1980–1989
Mayor of Chicago, 1989–2011
William M. Daley (born 1948)
U.S. Secretary of Commerce, 1997–2000
White House Chief of Staff, 2011–2012
John P. Daley (born 1946)
11th Ward Democratic Committeeman
Cook County Commissioner (Finance Chairman)
Illinois State Senator
Illinois State Representative
 Patrick Daley Thompson (son of Richard J. Daley's daughter Patricia) (born 1969)
 Metropolitan Water Reclamation District of Greater Chicago Commissioner 2014–2015
 Chicago alderman, 11th ward 2015–2022

See also
Kennedy family
Bush family
List of U.S. political families

References

 
Political families of the United States
People from Chicago
American families
American families of Irish ancestry
Families from Illinois
Families from New York (state)
Roman Catholic families